L.A. Wolves FC is an American amateur soccer club based in Torrance, California. They are named after the Los Angeles Wolves who played in the United Soccer Association in 1967 and in the North American Soccer League in 1968.

The club features its Men's Pro Development first team, L.A. Wolves FC (United Premier Soccer League), and its Youth Academy.

History 
Club owner and UPSL Commissioner Yan Skwara re-launched L.A. Wolves FC in 2014, after taking a number of names for a club into consideration. The club was founded with the aspirations of turning professional in mind. L.A. Wolves play their home games at Toyota Sports Complex in Torrance and are a current member of the United Premier Soccer League (UPSL), a USASA Premier league.

On August 30, 2014 the L.A. Wolves played their first match, a 6–0 victory in a friendly over the Orange County Crew SC at Toyota Sports Complex.

On 18 December 2018, the Wolves announced a player development affiliation with Orange County SC of the USL Championship.

Lamar Hunt U.S. Open Cup
L.A. Wolves FC is a four-time participant in Open Qualifying for the Lamar Hunt U.S. Open Cup, and has twice advanced to the tournament's Third Round (2016–17).

During the club's opening USOC qualification effort in 2016, Wolves FC defeated Del Rey City SC (UPSL) and Cal FC (UPSL) to advance to the tournament proper. In the First Round, Wolves FC walked over Ventura County Fusion of the Premier Development League by way of protest and disqualification, due to VC Fusion fielding of an ineligible player. Wolves FC followed with a 4–2 shootout victory in the Second Round over Orange County Blues FC of the United Soccer League before falling to La Máquina FC (UPSL), 2–0, in the Third Round. La Maquina FC went on to lose, 4–2 in overtime, to L.A. Galaxy of Major League Soccer.

International results

L.A. Wolves FC vs Monarcas Morelia U-20
The Wolves played Liga MX's Monarcas Morelia U-20 squad to a 4–4 draw on November 13, 2014, in a friendly in Inglewood, CA.

L.A. Wolves FC vs Club America U-20
On Sunday, July 12, 2015, the Wolves lost 5–0 to Club América U-20 squad in a friendly at Mira Costa High School Soccer Stadium in Manhattan Beach, CA.

Historic 2017 Spring Season

Head coaches
 Yan Skwara (Spring/Fall 2014, Spring/Fall 2016 & Fall 2017)
 Costa Skouras (Spring/Fall 2015)
 Eric Wynalda (Spring 2017)
Felipe Bernal (Spring 2018–current)

Notable players 

 Delfino Zea - F.C Dallas
 Paolo Cardozo – L.A. Galaxy (MLS)
 Cameron Marlow – Queen's Park Football Club (Scotland)

See also

Los Angeles Wolves (1967–68)

References

External links
 L.A. Wolves FC website
 United Premier Soccer League website

United Premier Soccer League teams
Soccer clubs in Greater Los Angeles
Association football clubs established in 2014
2014 establishments in California
Orange County SC
Soccer in Los Angeles